There has been an increase in incidents involving alleged radical Islamism in the Balkans since the 1990s.

Bosnia and Herzegovina 
1997 Mostar car bombing, organized by Ahmed Zuhair (Abu Handala), a Saudi mujahideen that fought in Bosnia. Handala was later arrested and detained in 2007 at Guantanamo.
On 19 October 2005 Bosnian–Swedish Mirsad Bektašević was arrested during a police raid Sarajevo, together with a Danish citizen. A home-made suicide belt,  of factory-made explosives, timing devices, detonators and a Hi-8 videotape with footage demonstrating how to make a home-made bomb were found. A video (to be published following planned attacks) of the two arrested, in ski masks, surrounded by explosives and weapons, was found, in which they say that they will attack sites in Europe to punish nations with forces in Afghanistan and Iraq. They were suspected of planning a suicide attack against a Western embassy in Sarajevo.
27 June 2010 terrorist attack on Bugojno police station, in which IEDs exploded by the guard walls, killing one, seriously wounding one, and wounding several other policemen. The perpetrator Haris Čaušević, an ethnic Bosniak, was sentenced to 35 years. He has stated that he has no remorse.
Mevlid Jašarević, a 23-year-old Serbian-born Bosniak, fired on the U.S. embassy in Sarajevo on 28 October 2011, resulting in one local policeman guarding the embassy being wounded in the arm, while the shooter was wounded by a police sniper. On 24 April 2012 Jašarević was indicted by a federal grand jury in the D.C. on charges of attempted murder and other violations in connection with the attack on the embassy. A Bosnian court sentenced him on 6 December 2012 to 18 years in prison.
Husein Bosnić "Bilal", a Bosnian Muslim cleric and unofficial leader of the Salafist movement in Bosnia, was arrested in September 2014 and is currently on trial for recruiting ISIS fighters.  In his various khutbas, he also advocated the "victory of Islam", promoting war and bloodshed. Moreover, in 2012 he called for other Muslims to join the Jihad and to defend Islam, for which he was briefly arrested and soon released.

Bulgaria 
The Iztok neighbourhood of Pazardzhik, inhabited by Muslims (Romani), includes an Islamist community headed by unlicensed imam Ahmed Moussa.

Kosovo 

Kosovo has a mainly secular Muslim population, part of a cultural remainder from the Ottoman era. The traditional Islam in Kosovo is the Hanafi school, described as 'liberal' and 'moderate'.

Islamist volunteers in the Kosovo Liberation Army from Western Europe of ethnic Albanian, Turkish, and North African origin, were recruited by Islamist leaders in Western Europe allied to Bin Laden and Zawahiri. Some 175 Yemeni mujahideen arrived in early May 1998. There were also a dozen of Saudi and Egyptian mujahideen.

Since the Kosovo War, there has been an increasing radicalization of Islam in Kosovo.  Wahhabism, which is dominant in Saudi Arabia, has gained a foothold in Kosovo through Saudi diplomacy. Saudi money has paid for new mosques, while Saudi-educated imams have arrived since the end of the war in 1999. During UN administration, Saudi Arabian organizations sought to establish a cultural foothold in Kosovo. 98 Wahhabist schools were set up by Saudi organizations during UN administration.

The Kosovo Police arrested some 40 suspected Islamist militants on 11 August 2014. These were suspected of having fought with Islamist insurgent groups in Syria and Iraq.

By April 2015, a total of 232 Kosovo Albanians had gone to Syria to fight with Islamist groups, most commonly the Islamic State. Forty of these are from the town of Skënderaj (Srbica), according to Kosovo police reports. As of September 2014, a total of 48 ethnic Albanians have been killed fighting in Syria. The number of fighters from Kosovo is at least 232 and estimated at more than 300 (as of 11 February 2016).

A 2017 UNDP study shows that Islamic extremism has grown in Kosovo.

Croatia
1995 Rijeka bombing

Groups
Groups of ethnic Albanians were arrested by police in November 2016 in Kosovo, Albania and Macedonia for planning terrorist attacks. They were coordinated by IS commanders Lavdrim Muhaxheri and Ridvan Haqifi, both Kosovo Albanians, and planned attacks on international and state institutions, ultimately with the intent to establish an Islamic state. They planned to attack the Israeli football team during a match in Albania, and potentially Kosovo government institutions and Serbian Orthodox Church sites.
A group of ethnic Albanians, Kosovo-born immigrants to Italy, were arrested by Italian police in Venice on 30 March 2017 for planning blowing up the Rialto Bridge.

Notable people
Shukri Aliu, Macedonian Albanian imam, ISIS recruiter
Bilal Bosnić (b. 1972), Bosnian Salafi leader, terrorist organizer
Haris Čaušević, Bosnian Islamist, terrorist (2012 Bugojno attack)
Almir Daci, Albanian ISIS commander and recruiter
Ridvan Haqifi (1990–2017), Kosovo Albanian ISIS commander
Mevlid Jašarević, Bosnian Wahhabist, terrorist (2011 Sarajevo attack)
Lavdrim Muhaxheri (1989–2017), Kosovo Albanian ISIS commander
Kujtim Fejzullai (2000–2020), Macedonian Albanian terrorist (2020 Vienna attack)

References

Works cited
 

History of the Balkans
Islamism in Europe